"Better World" is a song by Rebel MC.

Better World may also refer to:

 Better World Books, an online bookseller
 Better World Club, an automobile association

See also
 A Better World (disambiguation)
 Better The World
 One Better World